The Ministry of Ungentlemanly Warfare is an upcoming American action spy film directed and co-written by Guy Ritchie, based on the 2015 book by Damien Lewis.

Plot
Billed as a true story about a secret World War II  combat organization founded by Winston Churchill and Ian Fleming, whose fighters' ungentlemanly warfare against the Nazis changed the course of the war, and gave birth to modern black operations.

Cast
 Henry Cavill
 Eiza González
 Alan Ritchson
 Henry Golding
 Alex Pettyfer
 Cary Elwes
 Hero Fiennes Tiffin
 Babs Olusanmokun
 Til Schweiger
 Henry Zaga
 Mohammad Nour Hakmi

Production
Paramount Pictures acquired the rights to Damien Lewis's book The Ministry of Ungentlemanly Warfare: How Churchill’s Secret Warriors Set Europe Ablaze and Gave Birth to Modern Black Ops in 2015. Guy Ritchie signed on to direct the project in February 2021, from a script by Arash Amel and an original pitch by Paul Tamasy and Eric Johnson, with Jerry Bruckheimer producing the film. In October 2022, Henry Cavill and Eiza González were set to star, with Paramount no longer involved. In February 2023, additional casting including Alan Ritchson, Henry Golding, Alex Pettyfer and Cary Elwes was announced.

Production began in February 2023 throughout Turkey, with filming to take place in Antalya.

The day filming began, it was announced Lionsgate had acquired U.S. distribution rights to the film, planning to give it a wide release sometime in 2024, and Black Bear International had sold international distribution rights for Europe, Latin America, Australia, New Zealand, Canada, South Africa, India and pan-Asian pay TV to Prime Video.

References

External links
The Ministry Of Ungentlemanly Warfare at the Internet Movie Database

Upcoming films
American spy films
Films directed by Guy Ritchie
Films shot in Turkey
Films produced by Jerry Bruckheimer
Black Bear Pictures films
Lionsgate films